Savignia producta is a species of sheet weaver found in the Palearctic. It was described by Holm in 1977.

References

Linyphiidae
Spiders of Europe
Palearctic spiders
Spiders described in 1977